This table lists aircraft production during World War II for the major allied and axis powers:

See also 
Air warfare of World War II
List of military aircraft operational during World War II
German aircraft production during World War II
United States aircraft production during World War II
List of aircraft of the United Kingdom in World War II

Notes

References

Bibliography
 Angelucci, Enzo. Complete Book of World War II Combat Aircraft (1988) 414pp
 Angelucci, Enzo. The Rand McNally Encyclopedia Of Military Aircraft, 1914-1980 (1988) 546pp; includes production data
 Harrison, Mark, ed. The economics of World War II: six great powers in international comparison (Cambridge University Press, 2000)
 
 Wilson, Stewart. Aircraft of World War II (Aerospace Publications, 1988), with photos, production data, service histories, countries of origin, and specifications for most World War II fighters, bombers and cargo planes.

Production
Economic history of World War II